The 1918 Vermont Green and Gold football team was an American football team that represented  the University of Vermont as an independent during the 1918 college football season and, the team compiled a 0–1–1 record.

Schedule

References

Vermont
Vermont Catamounts football seasons
College football winless seasons
Vermont Green and Gold football